Nasaan si Francis? (English: Where is Francis?) is 2006 Filipino comedy film  by Gabriel Fernandez which stars Paolo Contis, Epi Quizon, Christopher De Leon and former Rivermaya frontman Rico Blanco. The movie is based on Fernandez's theatrical play of the same name.

Plot
Boy (Paolo Contis) is struggling to save his girlfriend Sofia (Tanya Garcia), who is forced to work as a prostitute for the scheming Madam San (Rio Locsin). Boy and his best friend Sonny (Rico Blanco) visit their childhood friend Francis (Epi Quizon), who is now a violent drug dealer. Unexpectedly, Francis suffers from a heart attack and dies. Instead of reporting the incident to his family, Boy and Sonny hid Francis' body as they searched the entire house for the tablets of Ecstasy, which they were hoping to sell. Chaos ensues when Francis' family and girlfriend, as well as drug pusher Rocky (Christopher De Leon) find out about his death.

Cast

Main cast
Epi Quizon - Francis
Paolo Contis -  Boy
Rico Blanco -  Sonny

Supporting cast
Christopher De Leon -  Rocky
Angel Aquino -  Anne
Rita Avila -  Lin-Lin
Julia Clarete -  Candy
Ricky Davao - Manong Jay
Michael de Mesa - policeman
Tanya Garcia -  Sofia
Mark Gil - Lin-Lin's boyfriend
Rio Locsin - Mama Bel
Karl Roy -  Marmar
Monty Macalinao - Rocky's driver

External links 
 

Philippine comedy films
2006 films
2006 comedy films